Torvund is a surname. Notable people with the surname include:

Alexander Torvund (born 2000), Hungarian footballer
Gunnar Torvund (1948–2019) was a Norwegian sculptor
Helge Torvund (born 1951), Norwegian psychologist, poet, essayist, literary critic and children's writer
Øyvind Torvund (born 1976), Norwegian composer